The East Sanday Coast is a protected wetland area on and around the island of Sanday, the third-largest of the Orkney islands off the north coast of Scotland. With a total protected area of 1,515 hectares, the 55 kilometre stretch of coast includes rocky and sandy sections, sand dunes, machair habitats, intertidal flats, and saltmarsh. It has been protected as a Ramsar Site since 1997.

The area supports a large number of over-wintering waders and waterbirds, including internationally important populations of purple sandpiper and  ruddy turnstone. It is also important for breeding populations of great black-backed gulls and common seals.

As well as the East Sanday Coast being recognised as a wetland of international importance under the Ramsar Convention, the whole of the island of Sanday has been designated a Special Area of Conservation.

References

Ramsar sites in Scotland
Wetlands of Scotland